The Latin Recording Academy Person of the Year is an award presented annually by the Latin Recording Academy, the same organization that distributes the Latin Grammy Awards, to commend musicians of Ibero-American heritage for their "artistic achievements in the Latin music industry as well as their humanitarian efforts". Award recipients are honored during "Latin Grammy Week", a string of galas just prior to the annual Latin Grammy Awards ceremony.

The award was first presented to Cuban American musician and producer Emilio Estefan in 2000 for increasing public awareness of Latin music. Eight years later his wife, singer Gloria Estefan, became the first female award recipient. She had previously received the MusiCares Person of the Year award in 1994, a similar honor presented by the National Academy of Recording Arts and Sciences, the same organization that distributes the Grammy Awards.

Spanish singer Julio Iglesias received the second award in 2001. Ranchera singer Vicente Fernández won the award in 2002 for donating ticket proceeds to the National Hispanic Scholarship Fund. Brazilian singer Gilberto Gil received the award the following year. The 2004 award went to Carlos Santana, who founded the Milagro Foundation in 1998 with his wife, which "supports young people involved in the arts, health and education". Mexican singer José José, known as the "Prince of Song", received the award in 2005. Puerto Rican entertainer Ricky Martin received the award in 2006 after his foundation launched the People for Children project, which works to eliminate human trafficking. Juan Luis Guerra, known for popularizing merengue and bachata music, received the award the following year for founding a non-profit organization that has helped build hospitals, churches and recreation centers in the Dominican Republic. The 2009 award recipient, Juan Gabriel, is known for donating concert proceeds to his favorite children's foster homes and for founding Semjase, an orphanage for approximately 120 children. Spanish tenor Plácido Domingo received the 2010 award for founding Operalia, The World Opera Competition (an annual international voice competition), for raising millions of dollars through benefit concerts for disaster victims, for helping to establish a hospital in Lerma, Mexico State, and for additional goodwill efforts.

Juanes is the most recipient of the Person of the Year award in 2019. The Person of the Year gala, along with the Lifetime Achievement and the Trustees awards, were not presented in 2020 due to the COVID-19 pandemic.

Since its inception, the award has been presented to musicians originating from Brazil, Colombia, Cuba, the Dominican Republic, Mexico, Puerto Rico, Spain, Panama, Italy, and the United States.

Recipients

 Each year is linked to an article about the Latin Grammy Awards ceremony of that year.

See also
 Latin Grammy Lifetime Achievement Award
 Latin Grammy Trustees Award
 List of humanitarian and service awards
 List of Latin Grammy Awards categories
 Billboard Spirit of Hope Award

Notes

References

External links
 Latin Grammy Awards

2000 establishments in the United States
Awards established in 2000
 
Tribute concerts
Humanitarian and service awards